Echinops adenocaulos is a species of flowering plant in the family Asteraceae. It is native to Israel, Palestine, Jordan, Syria, and Lebanon.

References

adenocaulos
Taxa named by Pierre Edmond Boissier